Garcinia costata is a species of flowering plant in the family Clusiaceae. It is a tree endemic to Peninsular Malaysia.

References

costata
Endemic flora of Peninsular Malaysia
Trees of Peninsular Malaysia
Vulnerable plants
Taxonomy articles created by Polbot